Cherryfield is a Neighbourhood in the city of Moncton, New Brunswick.

History

In 1898 Cherryfield was a farming and lumbering community with 1 church and a population of 75. It was later amalgamated with the City of Moncton.

Places of note

See also

List of neighbourhoods in Moncton
List of neighbourhoods in New Brunswick

Bordering communities

References

Neighbourhoods in Moncton